Zarechny Peshnigort is a rural locality (a village) in Stepanovskoye Rural Settlement, Kudymkarsky District, Perm Krai, Russia. The population was 68 as of 2010.

Geography 
Zarechny Peshnigort is located 9 km southwest of Kudymkar (the district's administrative centre) by road. Peshnigort is the nearest rural locality.

References 

Rural localities in Kudymkarsky District